is a railway station on the Nemuro Main Line of JR Hokkaido located in Nemuro, Hokkaidō, Japan. The station opened on October 1, 1961.

Layout
Kombumori Station has a single side platform.

Platforms
 Platforms

Adjacent stations

References

Railway stations in Hokkaido Prefecture
Railway stations in Japan opened in 1961
Nemuro, Hokkaido